Windsor Township, Ohio may refer to:
Windsor Township, Ashtabula County, Ohio
Windsor Township, Lawrence County, Ohio
Windsor Township, Morgan County, Ohio

See also
Windsor Township (disambiguation)

Ohio township disambiguation pages